Mahbubur is an Arabic name meaning beloved. The name is very common in the Muslim countries of South Asia (e.g. Bangladesh and Pakistan). People with this name include:

 Mahbubur Rahman, Bangladeshi lawyer and politician
 Mahbubur Rahman (born 1969), Bangladeshi cricketer
 Mahbubur Rahman (born 1957), Bangladeshi cricket umpire
 Muhammad Mahbubur Rahman, Bangladeshi general and politician

Arabic masculine given names
Bangladeshi masculine given names